Ain Roost (born May 12, 1946) is a retired male discus thrower, who represented Canada twice (1972 and 1976) at the Summer Olympics. A resident of San Diego, California, he claimed the bronze medal in the men's discus throw event at the 1971 Pan American Games in Cali, Colombia and finished fifth at the 1975 Pan American Games.

Ain Roost was born in Sweden to parents who left Estonia to escape the Soviet occupation. When he was five years old, the family moved to Canada.

References
 Canadian Olympic Committee
 

1946 births
Living people
Athletes (track and field) at the 1972 Summer Olympics
Athletes (track and field) at the 1976 Summer Olympics
Athletes (track and field) at the 1967 Pan American Games
Athletes (track and field) at the 1971 Pan American Games
Athletes (track and field) at the 1975 Pan American Games
Athletes (track and field) at the 1966 British Empire and Commonwealth Games
Athletes (track and field) at the 1974 British Commonwealth Games
Canadian male discus throwers
Canadian male javelin throwers
Canadian male shot putters
Olympic track and field athletes of Canada
Sportspeople from Uppsala
Swedish people of Estonian descent
Swedish emigrants to Canada
Utah State University alumni
Canadian people of Estonian descent
Commonwealth Games competitors for Canada
Pan American Games bronze medalists for Canada
Pan American Games medalists in athletics (track and field)
Medalists at the 1971 Pan American Games